The London, Brighton and South Coast Railway E1 Class were  steam locomotives designed by William Stroudley in 1874 for short-distance goods and piloting duties. They were originally classified E, and generally known as "E-tanks"; They were reclassified E1 in the time of D. E. Marsh.

Construction and use 
The first six locomotives of this useful and long-lived class were built at Brighton and appeared in traffic between September 1874 and March 1875. They performed well and further orders were placed at regular intervals until December 1891 when the class consisted of eighty locomotives and were used throughout the LBSCR system, principally for goods and shunting, but occasionally for secondary passenger duties.

In 1884 Stroudley also built one example of the class (No. 157 Barcelona) with a larger boiler and Gladstone-type cylinders with valves underneath to work on the steeply-graded lines between Eastbourne and Tunbridge Wells. This Special E-tank was withdrawn in 1922.

Rebuilds and withdrawals 

After 1894/95, the class gradually began to be replaced by R. J. Billinton's radial tanks of the E3 and E4 classes. Withdrawals commenced in 1908 when one locomotive was broken up for spares, and others were withdrawn at intervals until May 1914, when the increased need for locomotives during the First World War meant that there were no further withdrawals. One locomotive (no. 89) was rebuilt with a larger boiler by D. E. Marsh between January and June 1911 and reclassified E1X; it was renumbered 89A in October 1911, and 689 in December 1912. However this was rebuilt as an E1 in 1930 once the boiler was condemned.

Under Southern Railway ownership, withdrawals continued during the 1920s, with some examples sold to industrial railways rather than scrapped. Eight examples were also rebuilt as  radial tank engines for use in the west of England. These were classified as E1/R.

Four E1s were also transferred for duties on the Isle of Wight: three were shipped from Southampton on 4 July 1932 and a fourth on 16 June 1933. Before transfer, they were overhauled at Eastleigh Works, painted green, renumbered W1-W4 and given names related to the Island.
136 (originally Brindisi) became W1 Medina.
152 (originally Hungary) became W2 Yarmouth.
154 (originally Madrid) became W3 Ryde. 	
131 (originally Gournay) became W4 Wroxall.
Nos. W1–W3 were allocated to Newport, and no. W4 was at Ryde. They were primarily intended for goods traffic, but were used on passenger trains where necessary. At speed they were unsteady, but after No. W4 was successfully rebalanced at Ryde Works in October 1933 the others were modified similarly during 1935–36.

Thirty examples survived the transfer of ownership to British Railways in 1948, but during the 1950s they were gradually replaced by diesel shunters. The last survivor, BR No. 32694, was allocated to Southampton Docks. It was withdrawn in July 1961 and scrapped at Eastleigh Works later that year.

The four on the Isle of Wight worked goods trains until route closures in the 1950s brought a reduction in their duties. When repairs became due, they were withdrawn from service instead of being overhauled: No. W2 was withdrawn in September 1956, No. W1 in March 1957, No. W3 in June 1959 and No. W4 in October 1960.

Preservation 

One example, No. B110 (originally No. 110 Burgundy) was sold in 1927 to the Cannock and Rugeley Colliery Company.  They gave it the number 9 and named it Cannock Wood, and it worked their internal system until 1963.

After withdrawal it was bought for preservation and moved between several sites before restoration began in 1986 and it returned to action at the East Somerset Railway in 1993. It was withdrawn prematurely in 1997 requiring firebox and boiler repairs, and spent many years in pieces awaiting overhaul, although in 2011 it was cosmetically restored into (inauthentic) BR black.

In 2012, B110 was sold to the Isle of Wight Steam Railway, in return for  LMS Ivatt Class 2 no. 46447 moving to the ESR. The railway plans to restore the engine and run it as No. W2 Yarmouth, which was an identity previously worn by one of the Isle of Wight-based E1s.

Notes

References

External links

 Steam locomotive database
 East Somerset Railway page
 Rail UK database entry
 Southern E-Group

0-6-0T locomotives
E1
Railway locomotives introduced in 1874
Standard gauge steam locomotives of Great Britain
Rail transport on the Isle of Wight